Luca Forte was an Italian painter of the Baroque period, active mainly as a still-life painter in Naples.

Born in Naples. Little documentary evidence exists about him. He was a witness to the marriage of Aniello Falcone in 1639, and collaborated on a project with Falcone. He specialized in still lifes, often rich in fruits, as opposed to flowers. Among other contemporary still-life painters active in Naples of his day were Paolo Porpora, Giovanni Battista Ruoppolo, and Pietro Paolo Bonzi.

References
 Grove encyclopedia of Art abstract.
 Web gallery of art.

1610s births
1670s deaths
17th-century Italian painters
Italian male painters
17th-century Neapolitan people
Italian Baroque painters
Italian still life painters
Painters from Naples